Jan Elgaard Nebelong (born 18 January 1955) is a Danish curler.

Teams

References

External links

Living people
1955 births
Danish male curlers